Zeng Yan (born July 28, 1985), is a Chinese neo-folk musician from Chengdu, Sichuan. So far, she has released 3 studio albums and one soundtrack LP. She is known for her whisperish vocals and for her experimental folk sound.

Discography

Studio albums 
 2010: I Am Singing A Dream
 2012: One
 2012: Vie

Soundtrack album 
 2011: Great Wall My Love Original Soundtrack

Singles 
 2010: "Song For Home Pray For Soul"

References

External links
http://www.weibo.com/u/1706475904
http://blog.sina.com.cn/u/1706475904
https://www.facebook.com/kykko.zengyan
http://dailynews.sina.com/bg/ent/film/sinacn/20091129/0703915067.html

1985 births
Living people
Musicians from Chengdu
Asian Wave contestants
21st-century Chinese women singers